Gosaikunda is a rural municipality located in Rasuwa District of Bagmati Province in Nepal. Rasuwa district is divided into five rural municipality and Gosaikunda is one of them. It is located near the border of Tibet-China on Himalayan range. It is surrounded by Sindhupalchok District in east, Naukunda Rural Municipality and Kalika Rural Municipality in south and Uttargaya Rural Municipality and Aamachhodingmo Rural Municipality in west. Tibet is located on the north side of the rural municipality.

The rural municipality was formed on 10 March 2017, when Government of Nepal announced 753 local level units as per the new constitution of Nepal 2015 thus the rural municipality came into existence. The municipality was formed merging following former VDCs: Thuman, Timure, Briddhim Langtang, Syaphru and Dhunche. The municipality is divided into 5 wards and the admin center of the rural municipality is located at Syaphru (ward no. 5).

Etymology
Gosaikunda rural municipality was named after Gosaikunda lake, which is situated in Langtang National Park. The area of the park is extended into 3 districts Nuwakot, Rasuwa and Sindhupalchok but the Gsaikunda lake falls under Rasuwa District.

Point of interest

 Langtang National Park
 Gosaikunda Lake
 Rasuwagadhi

References

Populated places in Rasuwa District
Rural municipalities in Rasuwa District
Rural municipalities of Nepal established in 2017